Mapping the Atari, written by Ian Chadwick and published by  COMPUTE! Publications in 1983, is a location-by-location explanation of the memory layout of the Atari 8-bit family of home computers. The introduction is by Optimized Systems Software co-founder Bill Wilkinson.

The book covers the 64K address space of the system's 6502 processor from low to high, including addresses used by the operating system or mapped to hardware registers, as well as how to use them. For example, location 756 (2F4) CHBAS contains the starting memory address that tells ANTIC where to find the character set. The author explains how to use this feature to build custom character sets.

An updated version covering changes to the operating system and newer machines like the 130XE followed in 1985. Antic magazine serialized the book in 1989 and 1990.

Reception
The Addison-Wesley Book of Atari Software 1984 recommended Mapping the Atari, calling it "the most valuable reference book for machine language programmers".

Antic stated when serializing the book:

References

External links

1983 non-fiction books
Atari 8-bit family
Computer books